M-phase-specific PLK1-interacting protein (TTD non-photosensitive 1 protein) is a protein that in humans is encoded by the MPLKIP gene (previously known as C7orf11). Patients with an inherited defect in both alleles of the gene suffer from trichothiodystrophy (TTD), a disease hallmarked by brittle hair and nails and usually by developmental difficulties as well. One patient carries a homozygous deletion of the whole gene area, which indicates that the gene is not essential for embryonic development. TTD can be diagnosed by the presence of tigertail-striped patterns in hair visible under polarised light microscopy, or biochemically by a reduced Cys content of the hairs. Only a minority of the TTD cases carry a MPLKIP defect: more frequently, the gene ERCC2 is mutated, which encodes a subunit of the protein complex TFIIH that is required for general transcription and for nucleotide excision repair of DNA damage.

References

Further reading